MV Agusta Reparto Corse is MV Agusta's factory motorbike racing team, currently competing in the Superbike World Championship, Supersport World Championship and Moto2 (in collaboration with Forward Racing).

History 
Giovanni Castiglioni, Chairman and President of MV Agusta, signed an agreement with Alexander Yakhnich, Chairman of Yakhnich Motorsport, to establish the new MV Agusta Reparto Corse for the 2014 season. The team was operated by Yakhnich Motorsport and competed in the World Supersport and World Superbike Championships.

In June 2014 Castiglioni and Yakhnich signed an agreement which stipulates that MV Agusta will take over all operations concerning the racing team.

MV Agusta Reparto Corse partnered with Team Vamag in late 2017 in preparation for the 2018 Supersport World Championship. The team was known as MV Agusta Reparto Corse by Vamag that season.

Superbike World Championship
For the 2014 WSBK Season, Claudio Corti rode a race-prepared MV Agusta F4 for the team and finished 17th in the championship. Leon Camier substituted for Corti at Laguna Seca.

In 2015, 2016 and 2017, Leon Camier was the rider for the team, finishing 13th, 8th and 8th in the Championship in these years.

Jordi Torres was the team's rider except for the last two races, where Maximilian Scheib rode. Torres finished 13th in the championship and Scheib 26th.

WSBK Results

Supersport World Championship

For the 2014 Supersport World Championship Reparto Corse fielded riders Jules Cluzel and Vladimir Leonov on race-prepared F3 675s. Leonov was replaced by Massimo Roccoli from the Misano round onwards. Cluzel scored 3 wins for the team and finished 2nd in the championship this season. 

Jules Cluzel and  Lorenzo Zanetti rode for Reparto Corse in 2015, Cluzel winning 3 races. Due to injury, Cluzel was replaced by Nicolás Terol for the last three rounds.

In 2016, Cluzel and Zanetti were retained by Reparto Corse, Cluzel winning 2 races. Massimo Roccoli rode instead of Cluzel in the last race in Qatar.

P. J. Jacobsen and Alessandro Zaccone rode for Reparto Corse in 2017. 

MV Agusta Reparto Corse partnered with Team Vamag in late 2017 in preparation for the 2018 Supersport World Championship. The team was known as MV Agusta Reparto Corse by Vamag that season. Raffaele De Rosa and Ayrton Badovini were the two riders for the team. 

In 2019 Raffaele De Rosa was retained by Reparto Corse and joined by Federico Fuligni.

WorldSSP Results

References

External links 
 Official website
 SBK Superbike

Superbike racing
Motorcycle racing teams
MV Agusta
Motorcycle racing teams established in 2013
2013 establishments in Italy